Gabriel Virgil Florea (born July 12, 1985) is a Romanian football defender who plays for German lower leagues side FSV Offenbach. Since he was a boy, Florea played for important Liga I teams in Romania such as FCU Craiova (in 2004 and 2005, as a midfield), and Jiul Petroșani, in 2006-07 Liga I season.

At only 18, he was already holder in most of the games he played.
In 2007, he has ranked 5th with 5.76 points on a Jiul Petroșani forum.

Since 2007 to 2009, he played almost 100 games in Second League of Romania.

References
 http://www.romaniansoccer.ro/clubs/universitatea_craiova/u_craiova_2004_05.shtml
 http://www.romaniansoccer.ro/clubs/jiul_petrosani/jiul_petrosani_2006_07.shtml
 https://web.archive.org/web/20110720181149/http://www.servuspress.ro/hd/articol.php?id=13955

1985 births
Living people
Sportspeople from Craiova
Romanian footballers
Association football midfielders
Liga I players
Liga II players
FC U Craiova 1948 players
CSM Jiul Petroșani players
CSM Deva players
CSM Reșița players
Romanian expatriate footballers
Romanian expatriate sportspeople in Germany
Expatriate footballers in Germany
FC Unirea Dej players